The 2010 AFC Challenge Cup Final was an association football match between Turkmenistan and North Korea on 27 February 2010 at Sugathadasa Stadium in Colombo, Sri Lanka.

Background
The AFC Challenge Cup was an international football competition for Asian Football Confederation (AFC) nations that was categorized as "emerging countries" in the "Vision Asia" program. It was an idea by former AFC president, Mohammed Bin Hammam which its goal to raise the standards of Asian football at all levels. The AFC Challenge Cup, which reflected the philosophy of "Vision Asia", was created for teams to experience playing in a continental competition with the possibility to win an AFC trophy and potentially discover new talent. It was held in every two years as its inaugural edition took place on 2006 in Bangladesh. The winner qualifies for the 2011 AFC Asian Cup.

Route to the final

Match

References

Final
AFC Challenge Cup Finals
North Korea national football team matches
Turkmenistan national football team matches
AFC Challenge Cup 2010
2010 in North Korean football
2010 in Turkmenistani football
February 2010 sports events in Asia